Angels of the Arrabal (Spanish:Ángeles de arrabal) is a 1949 Mexican crime film directed by Raúl de Anda and starring Sofía Álvarez, David Silva and Carlos López Moctezuma.

The film's sets were designed by the art director Jorge Fernández.

Cast
 Sofía Álvarez as Lupe, La Tapatía 
 David Silva as Juan Martínez, el nene  
 Carlos López Moctezuma as Comandante Pepe Morán  
 Carmelita González as Lolita 
 Víctor Parra as Manuel Sánchez, el Suavecito  
 Sara Montes as Lucha  
 José Elías Moreno as El aguador 
 Gregorio Acosta as Cliente cabaret  
 Julia Alonso as Cabaretera habla telefono  
 Gloria Cansino as Enfermera  
 Alfonso Carti as Policía  
 Jorge Chesterking as Cliente cabaret  
 Manuel de la Vega as El 27, agente policía  
 José Escanero as Custodio
 Magdalena Estrada as Cabaretera 
 Amalia Gama as Panchita  
 Pascual García Peña
 Beatriz Jimeno as Enfermera amargada  
 Araceli Julián as Cantante  
 Francisco Llopis as Don Ramón  
 Carmen Manzano as Cabaretera 
 Pepe Martínez as Sr. Glad  
 José Muñoz as Don Miguel  
 Pepe Nava as Flaco  
 Gonzalo Ruiz 
 Raquel Téllez Girón as La negra, encargada cabaret

References

Bibliography 
 Emilio García Riera. Historia del cine mexicano. Secretaría de Educación Pública, 1986.

External links 
 

1949 films
1949 crime films
Mexican crime films
1940s Spanish-language films
Films scored by Manuel Esperón
Mexican black-and-white films
1940s Mexican films